The Motorola Droid Bionic is an Android-based, 4G LTE-capable smartphone designed by Motorola. It was originally scheduled for release in Q2 2011 but was delayed, eventually being released on 8 September 2011.

It was introduced at the 2011 Consumer Electronics Show along with the Motorola Atrix 4G, Motorola Xoom, and Motorola CLIQ 2.

Reception
According to several sites there have been early complaints of a high-pitched whine during audio playback through the headphones. With the first officially available update, released to testers on 9 December 2011, this issue was solved.

Software updates
Verizon Wireless announced the first firmware upgrade for the Droid Bionic, version 5.5.893, on 8 December 2011. The update was pushed to a limited test group on 9 December 2011, with plans to release it as an over-the-air (OTA) update package at a later date. The patch fixes many of the issues users reported at the Bionic's launch, with improvements including a smoother hand-off between 4G (LTE) and 3G (eHRPD/CDMA) data networks and software attenuation to eliminate the high-pitched transistor bleed ("hum") previously noticed in sound from the 3.5 mm jack.

On 19 December, some owners began receiving yet another OTA update to version 5.9.901. It was later provided as a download for manual installation. Later on, the changelog, or list of improvements was released.

A Motorola employee later confirmed the update was released to some by accident, and will be later released to all other DROID Bionic users soon.

In April 2012, an OTA update to version 5.9.902 was done, followed by one in June to version 5.9.905.

In June 2012 Ice Cream Sandwich builds 6.7.2231, 6.7.2233, 6.7.232 & 6.7.235, were pulled from Motorola's servers through cheesecake. It provided users with Android 4.0.4, with many features such as overclocking the CPU from 1.0 GHz to 1.2 GHz and including Webtop 3.0. However, the leaks included many bugs, such as the webtop launcher causing systemUI to crash, white text in the widgets menu (In custom launchers), and facelock not enabling correctly. Leak 6.7.235 will not let users FXZ back to OTA 5.9.902.

In October 2012, Verizon officially pushed Ice Cream Sandwich Android 4.0.4 out to users.

In April 2013, Verizon officially pushed Jelly Bean Android 4.1.2 out to users.

Features
The smartphone includes 4G LTE, Wi-Fi, HDMI output, 1 GHz OMAP dual core processor, a 4.3" qHD display, 3G/4G wireless hotspot capability, GPS, an 8 MP low-light–capable camera with 1080p HD video capture and a front-facing camera capable of Video Chat. In the United States, the handset is distributed exclusively by Verizon Wireless.

Specifications
Motorola Droid Bionic (also known as Motorola XT875) was the first dual core Android handset to use Verizon's 4G LTE network. It comes with a 4.3 inch qHD (960 x 540) display, a 1 GHz OMAP4 dual-core processor from Texas Instruments, and 1 GB of LP DDR2 RAM. It also has an 8-megapixel camera capable of 1080p HD video and a front-facing camera to support video calling. The phone comes with Adobe Flash and HTML5 support, as well as with HDMI output to an HDTV.

Motorola Droid Bionic specifications:

General info:
Phone type: Smartphone

Network technology:
CDMA: 850, 1900
LTE: 700
CDMA Data: 1xRTT and EVDO Rev. A
LTE: Yes

Design:
Form Factor: Candybar
Dimensions: 5.01 x 2.63 x 0.42 (127.5 x 66.9 x 10.9 mm)
Weight: 

Display:
Resolution: 960 x 540 pixels
Physical Size: 4.30 inches
Colors: 16,777,216
Touch Screen: Yes (Capacitive)
Multi-touch: Yes
Proximity Sensor: Yes
Light sensor: Yes
Battery Capacity: 1735 mAh

Software:
Smart Phone: Yes
OS: Android 2.3.4 Gingerbread, upgradable to Android 4.1.2 Jelly Bean

Hardware:
Processor: OMAP4 Dual-Core
Processor speed: 1000 MHz (Overclocked to 1200 MHz from ICS update)
Memory: 1 GB RAM / 16 GB flash storage
3D Graphics hardware accelerator: PowerVR SGX540

Camera:
Resolution: 8 megapixels
Flash: Yes (Dual LED)
Features: Auto focus, Digital zoom
Video capture: Yes
Resolution: 1920x1080 (1080p HD) (30 frames per second)
Additional camera: Yes (VGA)
Video Calling: Yes

Multimedia:
Music Player: Yes
Supports: MP3, AAC, AAC+, eAAC+, MIDI
Video Playback: Yes
Supports: MPEG4, H.263, H.264
YouTube player: Yes

Internet browsing:
Supports: HTML, Flash
Built-in online services support: Facebook, Picasa, Twitter, Google Play

Services:
Type: S-GPS
Navigation: Yes
Phonebook Support: Yes
Capacity: Capacity depends on system memory
Features: Caller groups, Multiple numbers per contact, Search by both first and last name, Picture ID, Ring ID
Organizer Calendar: Yes
Alarms: Yes
Document Viewer: Yes
Other: Calculator
Messaging
SMS: Yes
E-mail: Yes (IMAP, POP3, SMTP, Microsoft Exchange)

Memory
Memory Expansion: Yes
Slot Type: microSD, microSDHC
Maximum card size: 64 GB
Built-in: 16 GB

Connectivity
Bluetooth: Yes
Version: 2.1
EDR: Yes
Wi-Fi: Yes, 2.4 GHz only (802.11b, 802.11g, 802.11n)
USB: Yes
Type: microUSB
Version: USB 2.0
Features: Mass storage device, USB charging
Headphones connector: 3.5 mm
HDMI: Yes
Version: 1.4
DLNA: Yes

Notifications
Service lights: Yes
Colors per light: Multiple

Other features
Sensors: Accelerometer, Compass, Proximity

Availability
Officially announced: 5 Jan 2011
Officially released: 8 September 2011

Webtop
Similar to the Motorola Atrix 4G, it has the integrated Debian-based 'Webtop' application from Motorola. The Webtop application is launched when the phone is connected to the external display through Laptop dock or HD multimedia dock. In Webtop mode, offering similar user interface of typical Ubuntu desktop, the phone can run several applications on external display such as Firefox web browser, SNS clients and 'mobile view' application enabling total access to the Bionic and its screen. In September 2011, Motorola released the source code of Webtop application at SourceForge.

See also
List of Android devices
Motorola Xoom
Motorola Atrix 4G
Motorola Cliq
Galaxy Nexus

References

Android (operating system) devices
Motorola mobile phones
Verizon Wireless
Mobile phones introduced in 2011
Discontinued smartphones
Mobile phones with user-replaceable battery